Janet Carnochan (November 14, 1839March 31, 1926) was a Canadian historian and teacher.

Early life and education 
Janet Carnochan was born on November 14, 1839, in Stamford Township, Upper Canada.

Obtaining a first-class county teacher's certificate at age 16, she began teaching immediately. At 18, after attending the Toronto Normal School for five months, she obtained a first-class B certificate.

Teaching 
Carnochan worked as a teacher for 39 years. She taught for a short time in Brantford, Ontario, and then for five years in Kingston, Ontario.

From Kingston she went to a school in Peterborough, Ontario, for a year, returning to Niagara-on-the-Lake, Ontario, in 1871. In 1872, she provoked local opposition by becoming "headmaster" of the Niagara Public School. She then became assistant teacher in the Niagara High School, holding that position for 23 years.

Scholarship 
In 1895, she founded the Niagara Historical Society. Through appeals to the public and discussions with provincial and federal cabinet ministers, she raised $5,000 for a historical museum at Niagara, of which she became the president and curator. The museum opened in 1907. 

Carnochan wrote, entirely or in part, at least 14 of the Niagara Historical Society's publications. Her writings include The History of St. Mark's Church, Niagara, published on the occasion of its centennial in 1892, and a companion, History of St. Andrew's Church, Niagara, also published as a centenary volume in 1894.

Carnochan died on March 31, 1926, in Niagara-on-the-Lake.

Publications

Notes

Sources

Further reading 
 

1839 births
1926 deaths
19th-century Canadian historians
20th-century Canadian historians
19th-century Canadian women writers
20th-century Canadian women writers
People from Niagara-on-the-Lake